The Very Best of Sheryl Crow is a greatest hits album by American singer-songwriter Sheryl Crow, released on October 13, 2003, in the United Kingdom and November 4, 2003, in the United States. The album was a commercial success, reaching  2 on both the UK Albums Chart and the Billboard 200, selling four million units in the US as of January 2008. The album also received a platinum accreditation by the International Federation of the Phonographic Industry for sales of over one million copies in Europe.

Track listing

International release
Internationally some tracks were changed:
The UK release features "Run Baby Run", which was later replaced by "The Difficult Kind" in the US.
The UK release features "C'mon C'mon" (featuring The Corrs) and later replaced by "Steve McQueen" in the US.
The US release replaces the last track, "Let's Get Free", with a country version of "The First Cut Is the Deepest".
A three-disc box set was released in the UK with live album Sheryl Crow and Friends: Live from Central Park CD and a bonus DVD of music videos for the songs on this album.
Some Japanese pressings also came with a DVD of Sheryl Crow and Friends: Live from Central Park.
For the French release, "The First Cut Is the Deepest" is featuring French singer Gérald de Palmas.
Last track of the German release is "It's So Easy" featuring Wolfgang Niedecken, which was released as a single.

DVD release
The DVD features 14 tracks, missing out "Light in Your Eyes","Picture",	"C'mon C'mon" and "I Shall Believe". Sound is PCM stereo.

Digital release
Digital US versions of the album at Amazon.com and the iTunes Store omit track 11, "Picture". All the subsequent tracks shift their numbering back accordingly. Internationally the song is still available digitally, but only when the album is purchased as a whole.

Personnel

Sheryl Crow – acoustic guitar, piano, bass guitar, vocals, background vocals, 12 string guitar
Jimmie Bones – keyboards
Tom Bukovac – electric guitar
Joel Derouin – concert master
Shannon Forrest – drums
Paul Franklin – steel guitar
Shirley Hayden – background vocals
Kid Rock – rhythm guitar, vocals
Abraham Laboriel Jr. – drums
Misty Love – background vocals
Jamie Muhoberac – keyboards
Kenny Olson – guitar
Michael Rhodes – bass
Matt Rollings – piano
John Shanks – bass, electric guitar, background vocals
Producers: Sheryl Crow, Bill Bottrell, Garth Fundis, Kid Rock, John Shanks, Jeff Trott
Engineers: Matt Andrews, Marc DeSisto, Jeff Rothschild, Al Sutton
Mixing: Chuck Ainlay, Kid Rock, Jeff Rothschild, Al Sutton, Dave Way
Production coordination: Shari Sutcliffe
String arrangements: Patrick Warren
Assistant: Josh Muncy
Contractor: Shari Sutcliffe
Photography: Naomi Kaltman, Peter Lindbergh, Mark Seliger
Liner notes: David Wild

Charts

Weekly charts

Year-end charts

Certifications

Accolades
Grammys

|-
|  style="width:35px; text-align:center;"|2005 || "The First Cut Is the Deepest" || Best Female Pop Vocal Performance|| 
|-

References

External links

2003 greatest hits albums
Sheryl Crow compilation albums
Albums produced by Bill Bottrell
Albums produced by Garth Fundis
Albums produced by John Shanks
A&M Records compilation albums